Every year, the National Basketball Association (NBA) awards titles to various leaders in the five basketball statistical categories—points, rebounds, assists, steals, and blocked shots. Both the scoring title and the assists title were recognized in the 1946–47 season are also recognized, when the league played its first season. The rebounding title was recognized in the 1950–51 season. Both the steals title and the blocks title were recognized in the 1973–74 season. Additionally, the three-point field goals title is also recognized as well during the 3-point implementation in the 1979-80 season. The minutes title was recognized in the 1951-52 season.

Key

Statistics leaders

Notes

References

Statistical leaders by season
Statistical leaders by season